Mrs. Dane's Defense is a 1918 American drama silent film directed by Hugh Ford and written by Henry Arthur Jones and Margaret Turnbull. The film stars Pauline Frederick, Frank Losee, Leslie Austin, Maude Turner Gordon, Ormi Hawley and John L. Shine. The film was released on January 7, 1918, by Paramount Pictures.

Plot

Cast 
Pauline Frederick as Felicia Hindemarsh
Frank Losee as Sir Danile Carteret
Leslie Austin as Lionel Carteret 
Maude Turner Gordon as Lady Eastney
Ormi Hawley as Janet
John L. Shine as Mr. Bulsom-Porter
Ida Darling as Mrs. Bulsom-porter
Cyril Chadwick as James Risbee
Amelia Summerville as The Duchess of Grantby
Frank Kingdon as The Vicar
Howard Hall as Mr. Trent
Grace Reals as Mrs. Trent
Mary Navarro as Mrs. Dane of Canada

References

External links 
 
 

1918 films
1910s English-language films
Silent American drama films
1918 drama films
Paramount Pictures films
Films directed by Hugh Ford
American black-and-white films
American silent feature films
1910s American films